State Route 100 (SR 100) is a north–south highway in northwestern Ohio. Its southern terminus is at State Route 309 near Iberia, and its northern terminus is at State Route 53 in Tiffin.

History

1924 – Original route established.

Major intersections

References

100
Transportation in Marion County, Ohio
Transportation in Crawford County, Ohio
Transportation in Seneca County, Ohio